Alexeyevsky District is an administrative and municipal district (raion), one of the twenty-seven in Samara Oblast, Russia. It is located in the southeast of the oblast. Its administrative center is the rural locality (a selo) of Alexeyevka. Population: 12,274 (2010 Census);  The population of Alexeyevka accounts for 36.8% of the district's total population.

References

Notes

Sources

Districts of Samara Oblast